Robert Egerton Swartwout (July 2, 1905 – June 2, 1951) was an American-born writer, poet, cartoonist, and coxswain. He was the only son of American architect Egerton Swartwout and British-born Geraldine Davenport Swartwout. He drew from his rowing experience to produce a locked room mystery about The Boat Race and many poems.

Rowing
Swartwout rowed and coxed for Middlesex School in Concord, Massachusetts, from which he graduated on June 13, 1924. While attending Trinity College, Cambridge, he became the first American to cox Cambridge University Boat Club to victory over Oxford in 1930.

Writing
At Trinity College, Swartwout earned a Bachelor of Fine Arts in 1928, followed by a master's degree in Literature in 1931. That same year he was president of the Cambridge University Liberal Club; his devotion to David Lloyd George was such that he later became, according to the historian Eric Hobsbawm, a Welsh nationalist. Swartwout was also a member and debater with the Cambridge Union Society. Under the pen name R.E. Swartwout he contributed to Granta and Punch, as well as crosswords for The Spectator. He wrote a short Holmesian piece entitled "The Omnibus Murder" and wrote four books:

Rhymes of the River and other verses, by R.E. Swartwout, W. Heffer and Sons Limited, Cambridge, 1927
The Monastic Craftsman: An Inquiry into the Services of Monks to Art in Britain and in Europe North of the Alps in the Middle Ages, by R.E. Swartwout, M.Litt. of Trinity College, Cambridge, Cambridge, W. Heffer and Sons Ltd, 1932
The Boat Race Murder, by R.E. Swartwout, Grayson and Grayson Ltd., Curzon Street, Mayfair, London, 1933. This book from the Cambridge Crime series has been reissued by Ostara Publishing.
It Might Have Happened. A sketch of the later career of Rupert Lister Audenard, First Earl of Slype, etc. [A political fantasy based on the imaginary extension of the life of Lord Randolph Churchill], by R. Egerton Swartwout, W. Heffer and Sons Cambridge, 1934

In 1931 Swartwout wrote the introduction to Sir William Schwenck Gilbert: A Topsy Turvy Adventure, by Townley Searle, London: Alexander-Ouseley, Ltd., 1931.

Personal
Robert Swartwout became a British subject on June 9, 1933.

Death
Swartwout died unmarried in Hartismere Hospital, Eye, Suffolk, England on June 6, 1951, of esophageal cancer complicated by pulmonary tuberculosis at the age of 45.

See also

List of Cambridge University Boat Race crews

References

External links
 http://hear-the-boat-sing.blogspot.com/2011/12/re-swartwout-another-blue-poet-and.html

1905 births
1951 deaths
Alumni of Trinity College, Cambridge
Cambridge University Boat Club rowers
Novelists from Massachusetts
American mystery novelists
20th-century American novelists
American male novelists
Middlesex School alumni
20th-century American male writers
American expatriates in the United Kingdom